The Shape of Water is a 2017 romantic fantasy film directed by Guillermo del Toro and written by del Toro and Vanessa Taylor. It stars Sally Hawkins, Michael Shannon, Richard Jenkins, Doug Jones, Michael Stuhlbarg, and Octavia Spencer. Set in 1962 Baltimore, Maryland, the film follows a mute custodian at a high-security government laboratory who falls in love with a captured humanoid amphibian creature, and decides to help him escape from death at the hands of an evil colonel. Filming took place on location in Ontario, Canada, from August to November 2016.

The Shape of Water was screened as part of the main competition in the 74th Venice International Film Festival, where it premiered on August 31, 2017, and was awarded the Golden Lion. It was also screened at the 2017 Toronto International Film Festival. It began a limited release in two theaters in New York City on December 1, 2017, before expanding wide on December 22, 2017, and grossed $195 million worldwide.

The Shape of Water was acclaimed by critics, who lauded its acting, screenplay, direction, visuals, production design, cinematography, and musical score. The American Film Institute selected it as one of the top ten films of 2017. The film was nominated for a leading thirteen awards at the 90th Academy Awards, winning four, including Best Picture and Best Director for del Toro, and received numerous other accolades. It was the second fantasy film to win Best Picture, after The Lord of the Rings: The Return of the King (2003). A novelization by del Toro and Daniel Kraus was published on March 6, 2018.

Plot 

Elisa Esposito, who was found abandoned by the side of a river as an infant with wounds on her neck, is mute and communicates through sign language. In 1962, during the Cold War, Elisa works as a custodian at a secret government laboratory in Baltimore, Maryland, and lives a very routine life in an apartment above a movie theater. Her only friends are her closeted gay next-door neighbor Giles, a struggling middle-aged advertising illustrator, and her co-worker Zelda Fuller. 

Colonel Richard Strickland has just captured a mysterious creature from a South American river and has taken the creature to the Baltimore facility for further study. Curious about the creature, Elisa discovers it is a humanoid amphibian. She begins visiting him in secret, and the two form a close bond. 

Seeking to exploit the Amphibian Man for a US advantage in the Space Race, General Frank Hoyt is eventually persuaded by Strickland to vivisect it. Dr. Robert Hoffstetler, a scientist who is secretly a Russian spy named Dimitri Mosenkov, pleads unsuccessfully to Strickland to keep the Amphibian Man alive for further study, while simultaneously ordered by his Soviet handlers to euthanize the creature. 

When Elisa overhears the Americans' plans for the Amphibian Man, she attempts to persuade Giles to help her liberate him. Giles refuses at first, scared of the consequences and ethics. After failing to get his job back; his rejected advances towards a male restaurant worker and witnesses that staff member kick out an African American couple, Giles has a change of heart. Hoffstetler stumbles upon Elisa's plot in progress and chooses to assist her. Though initially reluctant, Zelda also becomes involved in making the escape successful.

Elisa plans to release the Amphibian Man into a nearby canal when heavy rain will allow access to the ocean. In the meantime, she keeps him in her bathtub. Strickland interrogates Elisa and Zelda, among others, but he learns nothing. 

The Amphibian Man, curious about Giles's cats, is met with a hostile attitude from the cat. Giles discovers the Amphibian Man devouring the cat. When he tries to stop him, the Amphibian Man gets startled, slashes Giles's arm and rushes out of the apartment. He gets as far as the cinema downstairs before Elisa finds him and returns him to her apartment. The creature touches Giles on his balding head and wounded arm; and the next morning, Giles discovers hair has begun growing back on his previously bald head, while  the wounds on his arm have healed. Elisa continues to develop her romantic relationship with the Amphibian Man, culminating in sexual intercourse.

General Hoyt unexpectedly arrives and tells Strickland he has 36 hours to recover the Amphibian Man, or his career and life will be over. Meanwhile, Hoffstetler is told by his handlers that he will be extracted from the US in two days. Although the planned release date approaches, the Amphibian Man's health begins to deteriorate. 

Hoffstetler goes to meet his handlers, and Strickland follows him. At the rendezvous, Hoffstetler is shot by one of his handlers, but Strickland, in turn, shoots and kills both handlers. Having realized that Hoffstetler is a spy, Strickland tortures the dying Hoffstetler into revealing specifics on the "team" which "extracted" the Amphibian Man, and Strickland is surprised to learn that Elisa and Zelda are implicated. 

Strickland threatens Zelda in her home, unsuccessfully, until her husband, Brewster, reveals that Elisa has the Amphibian Man. Zelda immediately telephones Elisa, warning her to release the creature. An enraged Strickland ransacks Elisa's empty apartment until he finds the bathtub full of chemicals and a calendar note revealing where she plans to release the Amphibian Man.

At the canal, Elisa and Giles are bidding farewell to the creature when Strickland arrives, knocks Giles down, and shoots both the Amphibian Man and Elisa. The Amphibian Man quickly applies his healing abilities himself, and slashes Strickland's throat, killing him. As the police arrive on the scene with Zelda, the Amphibian Man takes Elisa and jumps into the canal where he swims around her, not knowing she is dead. When he applies his healing ability underwater to the scars on Elisa's neck, they open to reveal gills like his. She jolts back to life and the two embrace and kiss. In a closing voice-over narration, Giles conveys his belief that Elisa lived "happily ever after" and "remained in love" with the Amphibian Man.

Cast

Production

Development 

An international co-production film between The United States and Mexico. The film was directed by Guillermo del Toro from a screenplay he co-wrote with Vanessa Taylor. Del Toro formed the idea for The Shape of Water over breakfast in December 2011 with Daniel Kraus, his future collaborator on the novel Trollhunters. It was primarily inspired by del Toro's childhood memories of seeing Creature from the Black Lagoon (1954) and wanting to see the Gill-man and Kay Lawrence (played by Julie Adams) succeed in their romance. 

When del Toro was in talks with Universal to direct a remake of Creature from the Black Lagoon, he tried pitching a version focused more on the creature's perspective, where the Creature ended up together with the female lead, but the studio executives rejected the concept. Additionally, the film also shows similarities to the 2015 short film The Space Between Us. 

In placing the film in the 1960s, del Toro said "the movie is a movie about our problems today and about demonizing the other and about fearing or hating the other, and how that is a much more destructive position than learning to love and understand [...] if I say once upon a time in 1962, it becomes a fairy tale for troubled times. People can lower their guard a little bit more and listen to the story and listen to the characters and talk about the issues, rather than the circumstances of the issues."

Casting 
A fan of her performances in Fingersmith (2005) and Happy-Go-Lucky (2008), del Toro wrote the script with Sally Hawkins in mind for the female lead and pitched the idea to her while he was intoxicated at the 2014 Golden Globes. Hawkins prepared for the role by watching films of silent comedians Charlie Chaplin, Buster Keaton, Harold Lloyd, and Stan Laurel from Laurel and Hardy, the last of whom Del Toro told her to watch because he thought Laurel could "do a state of grace without conveying it verbally".

Doug Jones was chosen to portray the Amphibian Man in The Shape of Water, having collaborated with del Toro on Mimic (1997), Hellboy (2004), Pan's Labyrinth (2006), Hellboy II: The Golden Army (2008), and Crimson Peak (2015). In an interview with NPR, Jones said his initial reaction to learning the creature would also be a romantic lead was "utter terror" but trusted the director to expand the character's development. As Jones wanted to portray a creature distinct from others in monster films, he practiced a variety of movements in a dance studio. After del Toro told him to make the character "animalistic, but royal and regal", Jones decided to also portray the character as a Matador.

The part of Giles was originally written with Ian McKellen in mind, and del Toro was inspired to do so by his performance in Gods and Monsters as the real-life closeted gay filmmaker James Whale, the director of Frankenstein (1931), The Invisible Man (1933), and Bride of Frankenstein (1935), who found himself unemployable in his later years. When McKellen proved unavailable, del Toro sent an e-mail to Richard Jenkins, who accepted the part.

Michael Shannon was cast as Richard Strickland, the villain of the film. Shannon and del Toro had early conversations about the notion that Strickland would have been the hero of the film if it had been made in the 1950s, something that fascinated the actor. Octavia Spencer, who played the role of Elisa's co-worker, friend, and interpreter Zelda, found it funny that the people del Toro used to speak for the mute main character were people who represent very disenfranchised groups.

Filming and visuals 

Principal photography began on August 15, 2016, in Toronto and Hamilton, Ontario, and wrapped on November 6, 2016. The interior of the Orpheum (the movie theater seen in the film), is that of the Elgin and Winter Garden Theatres in Toronto, while the exterior of the building is the façade of the Victorian Massey Hall, a performing arts theatre not far from the other one. Elisa and Giles's old flats, which in the film are just above the Orpheum, were actually a set built at Cinespace Studios, West Toronto.

Del Toro was torn between making the film in color or in black and white, and was at one point leaning toward the latter. Fox Searchlight Pictures offered del Toro either a $20 million budget to make the film in color or a $17 million budget to shoot it in black and white. Del Toro admitted he was in "a battle I was expecting to lose. I was of two minds. On one hand I thought black and white would look luscious, but on the other hand I thought it would look postmodern, like I was being reflective rather than immersed." As a result, he chose to shoot it in color. In an interview with IndieWire about the film, del Toro said the project was a "healing movie for me", as it allowed him to explore and "speak about trust, otherness, sex, love, where we're going. These are not concerns that I had when I was nine or seven."

Music 

Three years before The Shape of Water was released, del Toro met with composer Alexandre Desplat to talk about the film's premise. In January 2017, Desplat was shown a rough cut of the finished film, and finding it similar to a musical, he agreed to compose a score. As a result, Desplat tried to capture the sound of water extensively to have audiences experience a "warm feeling" that is also caused by love. In an interview, he said the melody from the opening scene was "actually made of waves. I did not do that on purpose, but by being completely immersed in this love and these water elements, I wrote a melody that plays arpeggios like waves."

Writing the film score took six weeks; it was purposely composed to create the sense of immersion and to give the "sense that you, yourself, are floating". The two melodies, one titled "Elisa's Theme", are heard at the beginning of the film and later merge into a single piece of music by the end of it. To emphasize this effect and its final result, Desplat changed the sounds of the accompanying flutes, accordions, and whistles to "something blurred". On composing the score overall, he said that it was "a matter of sculpting the music and making it take the shape of the storyline." As a result, Desplat opted out of giving Shannon's character a melody.

The music for The Shape of Water was released on December 1, 2017, by Decca Records. At the 90th Academy Awards, it received the Academy Award for Best Original Score. Desplat noted that "when the movie's that beautiful—and I actually think this movie is a masterpiece—it makes your life much easier. You just have to put your hands on it and it takes you anywhere you want."

Release 
The Shape of Water premiered on August 31, 2017, at the 74th Venice International Film Festival, where it was awarded the Golden Lion for best film. It also screened at Telluride Film Festival, the 2017 Toronto International Film Festival, and BFI London Film Festival, among others. The film was released in two theaters in New York City on December 1, 2017, and then expanded to several other cities the following week. It had its official wide release in the United States on December 8, 2017.

On March 13, 2018, the film was released on Blu-ray, DVD, and digital download. Special features on the Ultra HD Blu-ray includes a making-of documentary, two featurettes, a MasterClass Q & A with Guillermo del Toro, an interview with artist James Jean, and three theatrical trailers.

Reception

Box office 
The Shape of Water grossed $63.9 million in the United States and Canada, and $131.4 million in other countries, for a total of $195.2 million.

After grossing $4.6 million over a three-week limited release, the film began its wide release on December 22, 2017, alongside the openings of Downsizing, Pitch Perfect 3 and Father Figures, and the wide expansion of Darkest Hour, and grossed $3 million from 726 theaters over the weekend, and $4.4 million over the four-day Christmas frame. The following weekend, the film made $3.5 million. The weekend of January 27, 2018, following the announcement of the film's 13 Oscar nominations, the film was added to over 1,000 theaters (for a total of 1,854) and made $5.9 million (an increase of 171% over the previous week's $2.2 million), finishing 8th. The weekend of March 9–11, following its four Oscar wins, the film made an additional $2.4 million. It marked a 64% increase from the previous week's $1.5 million and was similar to the $2.5 million made by the previous year's Best Picture winner, Moonlight.

Critical response 

On review aggregator Rotten Tomatoes, the film has an approval rating of 92% based on 463 reviews, with an average rating of 8.4/10. The website's critical consensus reads, "The Shape of Water finds Guillermo del Toro at his visually distinctive best—and matched by an emotionally absorbing story brought to life by a stellar Sally Hawkins performance." On Metacritic, the film has a weighted average score of 87 out of 100, based on 53 critics, indicating "universal acclaim". Audiences polled by CinemaScore gave it positive reviews; audience members under the age of 40 gave the film an average grade of either "A+" or "A", while those over 40 gave it an "A" to "A−", on an A+ to F scale; PostTrak reported that filmgoers gave the film an overall positive score of 80%.

Ben Croll of IndieWire gave the film an 'A' rating and called it "one of del Toro's most stunningly successful works... also a powerful vision of a creative master feeling totally, joyously free." Writing for Rolling Stone, Peter Travers gave the film 3.5 out of 4 stars, praising Hawkins's performance, the cinematography and del Toro's direction, and saying: "Even as the film plunges into torment and tragedy, the core relationship between these two unlikely lovers holds us in thrall. Del Toro is a world-class film artist. There's no sense trying to analyze how he does it." For the Minnesota Daily, Haley Bennett reacted positively, writing, "The Shape of Water has tenderness uncommon to del Toro films. ... While The Shape of Water isn't groundbreaking, it is elegant and mesmerizing."

Rex Reed of the New York Observer gave the film 1 out of 4 stars, calling it "a loopy, lunkheaded load of drivel" and that "the whole movie is off the wall". Reed's review was criticized for referring to Hawkins's mute character as "mentally handicapped" and for falsely crediting actor Benicio del Toro (spelled Benecio) as the film's director. Reed also stated Benicio was Spanish, whereas he is Puerto Rican; Guillermo del Toro hails from Mexico. The article was quickly edited to reflect the mistake made.

Accolades 

The Shape of Water received 13 nominations at the 90th Academy Awards, the most of any film in the 2018 race. It won in four categories: Best Production Design, Best Original Score, Best Director, and Best Picture. It was the second fantasy film to win Best Picture, after The Lord of the Rings: The Return of the King (2003). The Shape of Water was acclaimed by critics, who lauded its acting, screenplay, direction, visuals, production design, and musical score. The American Film Institute selected it as one of the top 10 films of the year. At the 75th Golden Globe Awards, the film earned seven nominations, winning for Best Director and Best Original Score. It received twelve nominations at the 71st British Academy Film Awards, winning three awards including Best Director, and fourteen at the 23rd Critics' Choice Awards, winning four awards.

The film also sparked some debate about whether it should have been eligible for a Canadian Screen Awards nomination, as it was filmed in Canada with a predominantly Canadian crew and many Canadian actors in supporting roles. Under Academy of Canadian Cinema and Television rules, to qualify for CSA nominations under the rules for international coproductions, at least 15 percent of a film's funding must come from a Canadian film studio. Even the film's Canadian co-producer, J. Miles Dale, stated that he supports the rules and does not believe the film should have been eligible. The Shape of Water also appeared on many critics' year-end top-ten lists, of which 25 critics chose it as their favorite film of that year. A novelization by del Toro and Kraus was published on March 6, 2018.

Plagiarism accusations 
In February 2018, the estate of Paul Zindel initiated a lawsuit in United States District Court for the Central District of California against director Guillermo del Toro and associate producer Daniel Kraus, alleging that The Shape of Water "brazenly copies the story, elements, characters, and themes" of Zindel's 1969 work Let Me Hear You Whisper, which depicts a cleaning lady bonding with a dolphin and attempting to rescue it from a secret research laboratory's nefarious uses. The complaint spends more than a dozen pages detailing alleged "overwhelming similarities" between the works. Del Toro denied the claim of the Zindel estate, saying that "I have never read nor seen the play. I'd never heard of this play before making The Shape of Water, and none of my collaborators ever mentioned the play." Distributor Fox Searchlight also denied the claim and said that it would "vigorously defend" itself in court. In July 2018, Judge Percy Anderson dismissed the suit and stated that del Toro and Fox Searchlight were entitled to recover their legal costs. On April 5, 2021, the following statement by plaintiff was released: "David Zindel, the son of Paul Zindel, author of Let Me Hear You Whisper, acknowledges, based on confidential information obtained during the litigation process, that his claims of plagiarism are unfounded. He acknowledges Guillermo del Toro as the true creator of The Shape of Water. Any similarity between the two works is coincidental."

There have also been accusations that The Shape of Water plagiarised Amphibian Man, a 1962 Soviet film based on a 1928 novel of the same name by Alexander Belyaev. Indie Cinema Magazine noted that both have a similar plot, the use of the name "Amphibian Man" in both films, the Soviet connection in both stories, and the 1962 setting. Amphibian Man was one of the highest-grossing Soviet films of all time, with up to 100million box office admissions in the Soviet Union.

The film also received accusations of plagiarism by Jean-Pierre Jeunet, the French director of the romantic comedy Amélie and the cult classic Delicatessen, who claimed that del Toro plagiarized some of the scenes within his works Amelie, Delicatessen, and The City of Lost Children. Other observers vehemently disagree with Jeunet's assertion. Jeunet pointed out some of the similarities in the saturation of the colours, overall art direction and the use of anthropomorphic objects, as well as the music, which is reminiscent of Yann Tiersen's soundtrack on the former. Responding to Jeunet's accusations of plagiarism, del Toro cited the influences of Terry Gilliam's works as the inspiration for The Shape of Water. Both composer Alexandre Desplat and del Toro have cited French composer Georges Delerue, whose work predates Tiersen's by decades, as the inspiration for the musical score. Desplat has also emphasized the importance of water as essential to both the score and to the themes of the film itself.

References

External links 

 
 
 
 

2010s historical films
2017 LGBT-related films
2010s monster movies
2010s romantic fantasy films
2017 films
American monster movies
American romantic fantasy films
American Sign Language films
BAFTA winners (films)
Best Picture Academy Award winners
Cold War films
American dark fantasy films
Films about disability
Films about orphans
Films about racism
Films about sexism
Films about prejudice
Films involved in plagiarism controversies
Films directed by Guillermo del Toro
Films produced by Guillermo del Toro
Films scored by Alexandre Desplat
Films set in 1962
Films set in Baltimore
Films shot in Hamilton, Ontario
Films shot in Toronto
Films that won the Best Original Score Academy Award
Films with screenplays by Guillermo del Toro
Films with screenplays by Vanessa Taylor
Films whose art director won the Best Art Direction Academy Award
Films whose director won the Best Directing Academy Award
Films whose director won the Best Direction BAFTA Award
Films whose director won the Best Director Golden Globe
Fox Searchlight Pictures films
Golden Lion winners
Magic realism films
2010s English-language films
2010s American films
2010s Mexican films
TSG Entertainment films